Big Idea in marketing and advertising is a term used to symbolize the foundation for a major undertaking in these areas - an attempt to communicate a brand, product, or concept to the general public, by creating a strong message that pushes brand boundaries and resonates with the consumers.

The term "Big Idea" has been used in the works of marketing gurus David Ogilvy and George Lois, and in a book authored by Thomas H. Davenport, Laurence Prusak, and H. James Wilson.

References

External links
What’s the Future of Advertising’s Big Idea?
What’s The Big Idea Anyway?
Getting to the Big Idea

Advertising
Brand management